Zoot Woman is the second studio album by Zoot Woman. It was released through Wall of Sound in 2003.

Critical reception

Andy Kellman of AllMusic gave the album 4 stars out of 5, saying: "The band's got the whole package, from top-shelf songcraft to soft synth-led hooks to dancefloor-ready rhythms (the bassist must know each and every Peter Hook line inside out) -- all the way down to the constant flitting between exuberance and melancholia." David Welsh of MusicOMH said, "it seems that Zoot Woman's self-titled effort is easily one of the best electronic releases of 2003 so far."

Track listing

Personnel
Credits adapted from liner notes.

Zoot Woman
 Adam Blake
 Johnny Blake
 Stuart Price

Technical personnel
 Tom Hingston Studio – art direction, design
 Anuschka Blommers – photography
 Niels Schumm – photography

Charts

References

External links
 
 

2003 albums
Zoot Woman albums
Albums produced by Stuart Price
Wall of Sound (record label) albums